Rolf Aagaard-Svendsen (born 28 March 1948 in Hellerup) is a Danish politician, who served as mayor of Lyngby-Taarbæk Municipality from 2002 to 2010, elected for Conservative People's Party. He was first elected into municipal council in 1982.

References

1948 births
Danish municipal councillors
Mayors of places in Denmark
Conservative People's Party (Denmark) politicians
People from Gentofte Municipality
Living people